Steven Fisher may refer to:
 Steven Fisher (diplomat) (born 1965), British diplomat
 Steven W. Fisher (1946–2010), American attorney who served on the New York Supreme Court, Appellate Division
 Steven Fisher, better known as Fisher Stevens (born 1963), American Actor.

See also 
Steve Fisher (disambiguation)